Michel Aupetit (born 23 March 1951) is a French prelate of the Catholic Church who was Archbishop of Paris from 2018 to 2021, when he resigned following reports of a relationship with a woman in 2012.

He was previously the Bishop of Nanterre beginning in April 2014 and before that an Auxiliary Bishop of Paris. Before becoming a priest, he was a physician and practised medicine for more than twenty years.

Early years 

Born in Versailles (Yvelines) on 23 March 1951, Michel Aupetit grew up in Chaville et Viroflay in the western part of the Île-de-France.

After attending his secondary school at the Lycée Hoche (Versailles), Aupetit studied at the Bichat Medical School of the University of Paris VII where he received an MD degree in 1978. He further specialized in medical ethics with obtaining a DU degree in this field from the Faculty of Medicine of Créteil in 1994. After that, he practiced general medicine in Colombes from  1979 to 1990. He taught medical ethics from 1997 to 2006 at the Centre hospitalier universitaire Henri-Mondor in Créteil.

Aupetit then studied for the priesthood at the seminary of Paris where he earned a Canonical Baccalaureate in Theology. He was ordained a priest for the Archdiocese of Paris on 24 June 1995 at the age of 44. He served initially as a vicar of the Church of Saint-Louis-en-l'Île from 1995 to 1998, and then of Saint-Paul-Saint-Louis from 1998 to 2001. He was also chaplain of high and middle schools of the Marais from 1995 to 2001.

From 2006 to 2013 he was vicar general of the Archdiocese of Paris.

Bishop 

On 2 February 2013 Pope Benedict XVI named him auxiliary bishop of Paris and titular bishop of Massita. He received his episcopal consecration from Cardinal André Vingt-Trois.

Pope Francis appointed him Bishop of Nanterre on 4 April 2014 and he was installed there on 4 May.

On 7 December 2017, Pope Francis appointed him Archbishop of Paris, and he was installed there on 6 January 2018. Pope Francis named him a member of the Congregation for the Oriental Churches on 6 August 2019.

On 5 September 2019, Aupetit and Rémy Heitz, the lead prosecutor in Paris, signed an accord agreeing to better cooperation which will speed up sex abuse investigations.

In late November 2021, Aupetit offered to resign after admitting to having had a relationship with a woman in 2012, before becoming a bishop, though he disputed press reports that described that relationship as a "double life" and called it an "ambiguous" relationship that did not include sexual relations. Pope Francis accepted his resignation on 2 December 2021. He was replaced by Mgr Laurent Ulrich.

Sexual Assault Probe 
French police began an investigation with allegations that the Michel Aupetit sexually assaulted a woman who is under legal protection as a vulnerable individual. The investigation launched in November 2022 and was a sexual assault incident said to have taken place several year before.

Selected works
Construisons-nous une societe humaine ou inhumaine?, Dumoulin, 2016
La mort, et après?: Un prêtre médecin témoigne et répond aux interrogations, Salvator, 2009
L'homme, le sexe et Dieu: Pour une sexualité plus humaine, Salvator, 2011
Qu'est ce que l'homme?, Francois-Xavier de Guibert, 2010
L'embryon, quels enjeux?, Salvator, 2008
Contraception: la réponse de l'Eglise, Pierre Téqui, 2000

References 

Sources

External links 
 Biography, Archdiocese of Paris (in French)
 Biography, French Conference of Bishops (in French)
 Biography, Catholic Hierarchy 

1951 births
Living people
21st-century Roman Catholic archbishops in France
People from Versailles
Bishops of Nanterre
Auxiliary bishops of Paris
Archbishops of Paris
French internists
20th-century French physicians
Catholic Church sexual abuse scandals in France